Hai'an is a town in Xuwen County, Guangdong province, situated at the southern extremity of the Leizhou Peninsula as well as geographic mainland China, facing Haikou on Hainan Island,  away, directly across the Qiongzhou Strait. It is also the southern terminus of China National Highway 207. , it has 2 residential communities and 5 villages under its administration.

See also
List of township-level divisions of Guangdong

References

Township-level divisions of Guangdong
Zhanjiang